Health Sciences North is a teaching hospital in Greater Sudbury, Ontario, Canada. HSN offers a variety of programs and services, with regional programs in the areas of cardiac care, oncology, nephrology, trauma and rehabilitation. Patients visit HSN from a wide geographic area across northeastern Ontario.

History
HSN was formed through the amalgamation of three separate hospitals in 2010. The city formerly had three community hospitals: Sudbury General (completed in 1950), Sudbury Memorial (completed in 1956), and Laurentian Hospital (completed in 1975), and one mental health and community service facility, Sudbury Algoma Hospital. The three officially amalgamated in 1997 to form one corporation, the Hôpital Régional de Sudbury Regional Hospital (HRSRH), but remained a multi-site facility. In 2000, the construction of the new one-site hospital began and was completed in 2010.

In October 2012, the new one-site hospital was renamed "Health Sciences North" as it evolved into an academic research centre, as well as a hospital. In 2013, HSN implemented a new strategic plan that focused on delivering patient-centred care, research, teaching and learning in northeastern Ontario and beyond.

Services
Health Sciences North offers a variety of programs and services, with regional programs in the areas of cardiac care, oncology, nephrology, trauma and rehabilitation. HSN's patients visit from a wide area across northeastern Ontario.

HSN employs 3,898 people, 270 physicians and has 586 volunteers - it is the single largest employer in Sudbury. In a typical year the hospital sees 328,207 outpatients and 61,540 people in the emergency department, and admits 22,633 people.

Services include:
Critical care
Intensive care unit
Respiratory
Cardiac care
Cardiac rehabilitation services
Emergency and ambulatory care
General medicine
Gastroenterology
Haematology
Infectious diseases
Stroke
Medicine and rehabilitation
Acquired brain injury
Intensive rehabilitation and outpatient rehabilitation
Chiropody
Regional Cancer Program
Community Oncology Clinic Network
Dental oncology
Genetics
Preventative oncology and screening
Supportive care
Cancer research
Diagnostic services
Diagnostic imaging
Laboratory services
Pharmacy services
Cytogenetics
Magnetic resonance imaging (MRI)
X-ray computed tomography (CT or CAT scan)
Ultrasound
Mammography
Family and child
Perinatal/labour and delivery
Paediatrics
Children's Treatment Centre
Domestic violence/sexual assault treatment program
Mental health and addiction
Seniors and rural outreach
Counseling and treatment
Crisis services
Developmental clinical services
Surgical
Orthopedics
Ophthalmology
Neurosurgery 
Urology
Cardiac surgery
Gynaecology
General surgery
Thoracic surgery
Otolaryngology (ENT)

Abduction incident
On November 1, 2007, a Kirkland Lake woman, Brenda Batisse, abducted a newborn baby girl from the SRH's St. Joseph's Health Care Centre site shortly before 1 p.m. The hospital immediately went into lock-down and a province-wide AMBER Alert was issued. All highways leading out of the city were roadblocked. Batisse had already passed a roadblock location. She was subsequently arrested at her home in Kirkland Lake at 8:30 p.m., and the baby was returned to her mother unharmed.

Batisse, an Anishinaabe who had been physically, sexually and emotionally abused by several relatives throughout her childhood, had no prior criminal record and an extenuating mental health background. According to trial testimony, Batisse abducted the baby because her own pregnancy ended in a miscarriage shortly after she was physically assaulted in the summer of 2007, and she feared that her boyfriend would leave her if he found out.

Batisse was eventually sentenced to five years in prison for the abduction. On February 5, 2009, the Court of Appeal for Ontario ruled that the sentence was not consistent with the principles established by the Supreme Court of Canada around the sentencing of First Nations offenders, and reduced her sentence from five to 2.5 years.

Computer virus
On January 16, 2019, Sudbury's Health Sciences North was hit by a computer virus that was affecting the medical records system, which is also used by 24 hospitals located in the north east region. As a preventive measure, systems at HSN were put on downtime, successfully avoiding dissemination of the virus. The other hospitals were not necessarily infected, but were impacted as a result.

Heliport
The hospital is equipped with a rooftop heliport.

References

External links
 Official Health Sciences North website
 Official Health Sciences North Foundation website

Hospital buildings completed in 1950
Hospital buildings completed in 1956
Hospital buildings completed in 1975
Hospitals established in 1997
Hospitals in Ontario
Buildings and structures in Greater Sudbury
Heliports in Ontario
Certified airports in Ontario
1997 establishments in Ontario